The fourth season of Love Island Australia premiered on 9Now on Monday, 31 October 2022 presented by Sophie Monk and narrated by Stephen Mullan.

Format
Love Island Australia involves a group of contestants, known as "Islanders", living in a villa in Mallorca looking to find love. To remain in the competition, the Islanders must be coupled up with another Islander, as the winning couple wins $50,000. On the first day, the Islanders couple up for the first time based on first impressions. However, throughout the series they may choose to "re-couple" and couple up with another Islander instead. Islanders may join the villa at several stages throughout the season.

Islanders who are single after each re-coupling risk being eliminated and "dumped" from the island. Islanders can also be eliminated via public vote, or through other means such as deciding among themselves who to vote off the island. During the finale, the public vote for a couple they want to win the series and the $50,000 prize. One person from the winning couple can then either split the money with their partner or keep it for themselves.

Season 4 was pre-recorded in August of 2022. All previous seasons of the show across the franchise have aired on a short delay, but while filming was still taking place to allow for public votes. An ITV Studios executive producer stated the change in format was so that the season would air during late spring and early summer in the Southern Hemisphere, but be filmed in the Mediterranean when the weather was still warm. A select group of "Love Island Superfans" were given access to live video feeds from the villa to participate in elimination votes, challenge polls, and date selections.

Islanders
The first Islanders were announced on social media, one week before the premiere episode. Of the islanders who have participated on Love Island Australia 4 include Love Island Australia 3 winners Mitch Hibberd and Tina Provis (separated since winning their show).

Coupling and elimination history

 : Holly was single after the first coupling. On Day 2, Holly chose to couple up with Jordan, leaving Claudia single. All other Day 1 couples remained the same.  Claudia was fake dumped and returned to the villa with two new boys, Callum and Tak.
: As new arrivals, Callum and Tak were able to steal a partner for themselves on Day 5. Tak chose Holly and Callum chose Layla. All other remaining girls recoupled with the boys.
: As new arrival, Maddy was able steal a partner for herself. She chose Mitchell.
: The two couples with the least votes were Vulnerable and the power to dump was with the two couples with the most votes.
: As new arrivals, Phoebe H and Vakoo were able to steal a partner for themselves on Day 14. Phoebe H chose Jordan and Vakoo chose Callum. Then Ben the new bomb had a 5 minute date with single girls Layla and Stella. And immediately Ben had to couple-up with one of them. He chose Stella.
: Al and Jessica went on a date and received a text to choose one couple to be Vulnerable. They chose Ben & Stella. Ben & Stella had to mutually decide who to be dumped.
: Al, Callum and Jordan had to decide to dump one of the bottom three girls.

References

2022 Australian television seasons
Television shows filmed in Spain
Television shows set in the Balearic Islands